There are approximately twelve nationally recognized  Public holidays celebrated in the Republic of Kenya, a country in East Africa.

References

External links
 http://www.worldtravelguide.net/kenya/public-holidays
 https://www.standardmedia.co.ke/article/2001259798/judge-restores-moi-day-as-public-holiday
 https://www.internationalwomensday.com/About
 http://www.kenyalaw.org/kl/fileadmin/pdfdownloads/Acts/PublicHolidaysActCap110.pdf

 
Kenya
Society of Kenya
Holidays